is a member of the Japanese Communist Party serving in the House of Councillors. She was elected in 2010 and again in 2016 for the National party list block.

Political career

Tenure
She criticized former Prime Minister Shinzo Abe's female cabinet picks, saying that they were performative instead of advancing women's empowerment.

References

1965 births
Living people
People from Nagano Prefecture
Female members of the House of Councillors (Japan)
Members of the House of Councillors (Japan)
Japanese Communist Party politicians